Adolfo Calero Portocarrero (December 22, 1931 – June 2, 2012) was a Nicaraguan businessman and the leader of the Nicaraguan Democratic Force, the largest rebel group of the Contras, opposing the Sandinista government.

Calero was responsible for managing the bank accounts into which money was deposited and then used to buy supplies and arms for the Contras. He was brought to testify at hearings of the US Congress in May 1987.

Early years
Calero was born on December 22, 1931 in Managua to Adolfo Calero Orozco (1899–1980) and María Portocarrero (1911–1944), who had married in 1927. The oldest of four children, he studied in the United States, graduating from University of Notre Dame in 1953 and Syracuse University. In Managua, he managed the Coca-Cola bottling plant.

Calero was associated with the Conservative Party of Nicaragua. From 1963, he was a CIA information source. Before the 1979 overthrow of the government of Anastasio Somoza, he had been briefly imprisoned, which gave credibility to his claims to have opposed Somoza as well as the Sandinistas.

Contra leader
In early 1983, he joined the political directorate of the Nicaraguan Democratic Force (FDN). By October he became its president, but many observers wondered about his real power because of the political wing's weak control over the military wing. In a bid to unify contra factions and win aid from the US Congress, he became a member of the United Nicaraguan Opposition (UNO) triumvirate with Alfonso Robelo and Arturo Cruz.

Calero controlled the FDN through his deputy, Aristides Sánchez, and the Contras' military commander, Enrique Bermúdez, an alliance so tight that it was dubbed the "Iron Triangle."

However, there were tensions below the surface. After the Sapoa ceasefire, Calero exploited discontent with Bermudez among the FDN's field commanders in an effort to push him out. Heavy-handed intervention by the CIA helped to crush that effort. Later, however, other commanders, with the blessing of the US State Department, ousted both their political and military leadership.
On July 26, 2011, he published his book "Cronicas de un Contra", which narrates his participation during the 1980s in Nicaragua.

Personal life 
Calero married Maria Ernestina Lacayo on December 7, 1957. The couple had two children, Myriam (b. 1958) and Adolfo (1960–1994). Calero has three grandchildren. He had three younger siblings: Myriam (b. 1933-2018) Mario (1935–1993) and Martha (b. 1943).

Death
Calero died in Managua on June 2, 2012 after complications from pneumonia and kidney failure. He was survived by his wife, daughter, three grandchildren, and two sisters.

In popular culture
In the 2017 film American Made, he was portrayed by Daniel Lugo.

References

External links

1931 births
2012 deaths
Nicaraguan businesspeople
Contras
Nicaraguan rebels
Nicaraguan revolutionaries
Syracuse University alumni
Place of birth missing
University of Notre Dame alumni
Conservative Party (Nicaragua) politicians
Deaths from kidney failure
Deaths from pneumonia in Nicaragua
Nicaraguan anti-communists
People of the Nicaraguan Revolution